The Armavir constituency (No. 52) is a Russian legislative constituency in Krasnodar Krai. The constituency covers southeastern Krasnodar Krai.

Members elected

Election results

1993

|-
! colspan=2 style="background-color:#E9E9E9;text-align:left;vertical-align:top;" |Candidate
! style="background-color:#E9E9E9;text-align:left;vertical-align:top;" |Party
! style="background-color:#E9E9E9;text-align:right;" |Votes
! style="background-color:#E9E9E9;text-align:right;" |%
|-
|style="background-color:"|
|align=left|Anatoly Dolgopolov
|align=left|Independent
|
|20.88%
|-
| colspan="5" style="background-color:#E9E9E9;"|
|- style="font-weight:bold"
| colspan="3" style="text-align:left;" | Total
| 
| 100%
|-
| colspan="5" style="background-color:#E9E9E9;"|
|- style="font-weight:bold"
| colspan="4" |Source:
|
|}

1995

|-
! colspan=2 style="background-color:#E9E9E9;text-align:left;vertical-align:top;" |Candidate
! style="background-color:#E9E9E9;text-align:left;vertical-align:top;" |Party
! style="background-color:#E9E9E9;text-align:right;" |Votes
! style="background-color:#E9E9E9;text-align:right;" |%
|-
|style="background-color:#F21A29"|
|align=left|Vladimir Pashuto
|align=left|Trade Unions and Industrialists – Union of Labour
|
|20.92%
|-
|style="background-color:"|
|align=left|Viktor Zhirinovsky
|align=left|Liberal Democratic Party
|
|13.86%
|-
|style="background-color:"|
|align=left|Tatyana Solovyeva
|align=left|Our Home – Russia
|
|11.79%
|-
|style="background-color:"|
|align=left|Georgy Troitsky
|align=left|Kedr
|
|10.39%
|-
|style="background-color:"|
|align=left|Anatoly Dolgopolov (incumbent)
|align=left|Independent
|
|9.35%
|-
|style="background-color:#D50000"|
|align=left|Viktor Denisov
|align=left|Communists and Working Russia - for the Soviet Union
|
|7.39%
|-
|style="background-color:"|
|align=left|Vladimir Martynenko
|align=left|Agrarian Party
|
|6.64%
|-
|style="background-color:#FF8201"|
|align=left|Viktor Babkin
|align=left|Christian-Democratic Union - Christians of Russia
|
|4.32%
|-
|style="background-color:"|
|align=left|Fyodor Inshakov
|align=left|Independent
|
|4.04%
|-
|style="background-color:#FF4400"|
|align=left|Ivan Zabazanov
|align=left|Party of Workers' Self-Government
|
|2.11%
|-
|style="background-color:#DD137B"|
|align=left|Raisa Rakhmail
|align=left|Social Democrats
|
|0.98%
|-
|style="background-color:#000000"|
|colspan=2 |against all
|
|6.45%
|-
| colspan="5" style="background-color:#E9E9E9;"|
|- style="font-weight:bold"
| colspan="3" style="text-align:left;" | Total
| 
| 100%
|-
| colspan="5" style="background-color:#E9E9E9;"|
|- style="font-weight:bold"
| colspan="4" |Source:
|
|}

1999

|-
! colspan=2 style="background-color:#E9E9E9;text-align:left;vertical-align:top;" |Candidate
! style="background-color:#E9E9E9;text-align:left;vertical-align:top;" |Party
! style="background-color:#E9E9E9;text-align:right;" |Votes
! style="background-color:#E9E9E9;text-align:right;" |%
|-
|style="background-color:"|
|align=left|Vladimir Pashuto (incumbent)
|align=left|Communist Party
|
|35.47%
|-
|style="background-color:"|
|align=left|Nikolay Kolosov
|align=left|Independent
|
|10.90%
|-
|style="background-color:"|
|align=left|Anatoly Silchenko
|align=left|Independent
|
|9.50%
|-
|style="background-color:"|
|align=left|Aleksey Andreyev
|align=left|Our Home – Russia
|
|9.22%
|-
|style="background-color:"|
|align=left|Oleg Isayev
|align=left|Independent
|
|8.55%
|-
|style="background-color:"|
|align=left|Aleksandr Solovyev
|align=left|Independent
|
|4.20%
|-
|style="background-color:"|
|align=left|Yury Belyayev
|align=left|Yabloko
|
|4.08%
|-
|style="background-color:"|
|align=left|Vladimir Rybalkin
|align=left|Liberal Democratic Party
|
|3.87%
|-
|style="background-color:#3B9EDF"|
|align=left|Sergey Kozaderov
|align=left|Fatherland – All Russia
|
|3.47%
|-
|style="background-color:#FF4400"|
|align=left|Vladimir Vakhaniya
|align=left|Andrey Nikolayev and Svyatoslav Fyodorov Bloc
|
|1.55%
|-
|style="background-color:#000000"|
|colspan=2 |against all
|
|7.48%
|-
| colspan="5" style="background-color:#E9E9E9;"|
|- style="font-weight:bold"
| colspan="3" style="text-align:left;" | Total
| 
| 100%
|-
| colspan="5" style="background-color:#E9E9E9;"|
|- style="font-weight:bold"
| colspan="4" |Source:
|
|}

2003

|-
! colspan=2 style="background-color:#E9E9E9;text-align:left;vertical-align:top;" |Candidate
! style="background-color:#E9E9E9;text-align:left;vertical-align:top;" |Party
! style="background-color:#E9E9E9;text-align:right;" |Votes
! style="background-color:#E9E9E9;text-align:right;" |%
|-
|style="background-color:"|
|align=left|Nikolay Litvinov
|align=left|United Russia
|
|46.17%
|-
|style="background-color: " |
|align=left|Vladimir Pashuto (incumbent)
|align=left|Communist Party
|
|23.40%
|-
|style="background-color:#408080"|
|align=left|Andrey Mozzhegorov
|align=left|For a Holy Russia
|
|7.07%
|-
|style="background-color:"|
|align=left|Aleksandr Lazovsky
|align=left|Liberal Democratic Party
|
|5.76%
|-
|style="background-color:#1042A5"|
|align=left|Aleksandr Batayev
|align=left|Union of Right Forces
|
|3.04%
|-
|style="background-color:#164C8C"|
|align=left|Aleksandr Prikhodchenko
|align=left|United Russian Party Rus'
|
|1.31%
|-
|style="background-color:#000000"|
|colspan=2 |against all
|
|11.58%
|-
| colspan="5" style="background-color:#E9E9E9;"|
|- style="font-weight:bold"
| colspan="3" style="text-align:left;" | Total
| 
| 100%
|-
| colspan="5" style="background-color:#E9E9E9;"|
|- style="font-weight:bold"
| colspan="4" |Source:
|
|}

2016

|-
! colspan=2 style="background-color:#E9E9E9;text-align:left;vertical-align:top;" |Candidate
! style="background-color:#E9E9E9;text-align:left;vertical-align:top;" |Party
! style="background-color:#E9E9E9;text-align:right;" |Votes
! style="background-color:#E9E9E9;text-align:right;" |%
|-
|style="background-color: " |
|align=left|Nikolay Kharitonov
|align=left|Communist Party
|
|35.23%
|-
|style="background-color:"|
|align=left|Andrey Frolov
|align=left|A Just Russia
|
|17.90%
|-
|style="background-color:"|
|align=left|Aleksandr Vysich
|align=left|Liberal Democratic Party
|
|13.50%
|-
|style="background:"| 
|align=left|Viktoria Guseynova
|align=left|Communists of Russia
|
|7.81%
|-
|style="background-color: "|
|align=left|Aleksandr Blagodarnov
|align=left|Party of Growth
|
|7.00%
|-
|style="background-color:"|
|align=left|Sergey Zakipnev
|align=left|Rodina
|
|5.49%
|-
|style="background:"| 
|align=left|Andrey Ovechkin
|align=left|Patriots of Russia
|
|4.34%
|-
|style="background-color:"|
|align=left|Denis Dvornikov
|align=left|The Greens
|
|2.66%
|-
|style="background-color:"|
|align=left|Yevgeny Pozdeyev
|align=left|Yabloko
|
|2.31%
|-
| colspan="5" style="background-color:#E9E9E9;"|
|- style="font-weight:bold"
| colspan="3" style="text-align:left;" | Total
| 
| 100%
|-
| colspan="5" style="background-color:#E9E9E9;"|
|- style="font-weight:bold"
| colspan="4" |Source:
|
|}

2021

|-
! colspan=2 style="background-color:#E9E9E9;text-align:left;vertical-align:top;" |Candidate
! style="background-color:#E9E9E9;text-align:left;vertical-align:top;" |Party
! style="background-color:#E9E9E9;text-align:right;" |Votes
! style="background-color:#E9E9E9;text-align:right;" |%
|-
|style="background-color: " |
|align=left|Andrey Doroshenko
|align=left|United Russia
|
|68.16%
|-
|style="background-color:"|
|align=left|Grachik Davtyan
|align=left|Communist Party
|
|11.16%
|-
|style="background-color:"|
|align=left|Nadezhda Kovalyova
|align=left|Liberal Democratic Party
|
|4.84%
|-
|style="background-color:"|
|align=left|Andrey Levashov
|align=left|A Just Russia — For Truth
|
|4.43%
|-
|style="background-color: " |
|align=left|Isa Ibragimov
|align=left|New People
|
|2.95%
|-
|style="background-color: "|
|align=left|Sergey Matveyev
|align=left|Party of Pensioners
|
|2.35%
|-
|style="background-color:"|
|align=left|Stanislav Grishin
|align=left|Rodina
|
|2.16%
|-
|style="background-color: "|
|align=left|Natalya Tsybulskaya
|align=left|Party of Growth
|
|1.31%
|-
|style="background-color: "|
|align=left|Sergey Stepankov
|align=left|Yabloko
|
|0.96%
|-
| colspan="5" style="background-color:#E9E9E9;"|
|- style="font-weight:bold"
| colspan="3" style="text-align:left;" | Total
| 
| 100%
|-
| colspan="5" style="background-color:#E9E9E9;"|
|- style="font-weight:bold"
| colspan="4" |Source:
|
|}

Notes

References

Russian legislative constituencies
Politics of Krasnodar Krai